Hernán Jorge Cline Raffaelli (born 3 September 1975) is a Uruguayan former road cyclist. He held Argentine citizenship until 2002.

Major results

2003
 1st Overall Vuelta a los Puentes
 1st Stage 2 Vuelta del Uruguay
 4th Overall Rutas de América
1st Stage 1
2004
 4th Overall Rutas de América
2005
 1st Overall Doble Treinta y Tres
1st Stages 1 & 2
 1st Stage 10 Vuelta del Uruguay
2006
 3rd Overall Vuelta del Uruguay
1st Stage 2
2009
 1st Overall Rutas de América
 1st Stage 5 Vuelta Chaná
2010
 1st Overall Rutas de América
 1st Overall Doble Treinta y Tres
1st Stages 1 & 2
 1st Overall Vuelta Chaná
1st Stage 3
 1st Stage 5 Doble Bragado
 2nd Overall Vuelta del Uruguay

References

External links

1975 births
Living people
Uruguayan male cyclists
Argentine male cyclists
People from Berisso
Sportspeople from Buenos Aires Province